Aaron Kwak (born May 21, 1993), also known by the stage name Aron, is an American singer, rapper and radio-television personality. He began his professional career in 2012 as a main rapper of the South Korean boy group NUEST. Following his contract's expiration with Pledis Entertainment in 2022, Kwak established his solo career as a freelance radio and television host, appearing in various South Korean programs.

Early life
Aron was born on May 21, 1993, in Los Angeles, California. He attended Loyola High School and was on the varsity golf team, earning the Rookie of the Year Award in 2008 from Daniel Murphy High School. He tested within the top 0.5% on the SATs with a score of 2180 out of 2400. Aron had been accepted into New York University and intended to major in journalism but ultimately did not attend after choosing to become a singer.

Career

Pre-debut

While attending the LA Korean Festival in 2009, Aron was invited to take part in the Pledis USA Personal Auditions, where he performed "So Sick" by Ne-Yo and participated in a one-week trial boot camp in South Korea. He subsequently signed with Pledis Entertainment. After finishing high school, he returned to South Korea and trained for nine months. Prior to debuting, Aron appeared as a back-up dancer in After School Blue's "Wonder Boy" in 2011. He participated in Pledis Entertainment's Christmas single "Love Letter" and was also featured in an alternate music video for the song as a member of Pledis Boys. He performed with After School with the rest of Pledis Boys, now dubbed "After School Boys", at the SBS Gayo Daejeon.

2012–2022: NU'EST

Along with four other Pledis Boys, Aron debuted in the boy band NU'EST in 2012 as a sub-vocalist. From April 8, 2013, to April 19, 2015, he hosted Arirang Radio's Music Access radio program. In 2014, he was featured as a guest artist on the song "Got it Figured Out" by Chad Future. From August 14, 2015, to April 24, 2016, he hosted his own radio show, Aron's Hangout, on SBS PopAsia.

From 2017 to 2018, Aron promoted with the other NU'EST members as the sub-group NU'EST W in the absence of Minhyun, who was exclusively promoting with Wanna One at the time. During the group's activity, he wrote the lyrics for his solo songs, "Good Love" and "Wi-Fi." He was also featured as a guest artist on the song "Loop" by Raina.

From 2020 to 2021, Aron hosted the radio show "To.Night" on Naver NOW with bandmate Ren.

It was announced on February 28, 2022, that NU'EST's exclusive contract with Pledis Entertainment will expire on March 14, 2022, and that Aron (alongside members JR and Ren) will leave the agency, therefore concluding their 10-year career as a group.

2022-present: solo activities 
On March 21, 2022, Aron announced he was hosting a podcast titled Korean Cowboys with South Korean television personality Joel Lane.

In May 2022, Aron was introduced as a host for the second season of Real Korea 5, a lifestyle channel. Within the same month, Aron held his first solo fan meeting at the Yonsei University's Centennial Memorial Hall to celebrate his 30th birthday with the fans.

In July 2022, Aron became a co-host of the Arirang TV talk show After School Club.

In November 2022, Aron opened his private messaging service thru Wonderwall's "Fromm".

Discography

As featured artist

Filmography

Television shows

Radio shows

Web shows

Awards and nominations

References 

1993 births
Living people
People from Los Angeles
Rappers from Los Angeles
Singers from Los Angeles
American expatriates in South Korea
American rappers of East Asian descent
American K-pop singers
Korean-language singers of the United States
Pledis Entertainment artists
South Korean male idols